Issikiocrania is a genus of moths of the family Eriocraniidae. It contains only one species, Issikiocrania japonicella, which is found in Japan.

The larvae feed on Fagus crenata.

References

Eriocraniidae
Monotypic moth genera
Moths of Japan